ANBL may refer to:

 Alcool NB Liquor (or New Brunswick Liquor Corporation)
 All Nations Breath of Life, a smoking cessation program for the American Indian community
 American National Basketball League, a professional men's basketball minor league in the United States
 Aurora North Branch Library
 Australian National Basketball League, the pre-eminent professional men's basketball league in Oceania
 Australian Network to Ban Landmines